Ituano Futebol Clube, commonly referred to as simply Ituano, is a Brazilian association football club in Itu, São Paulo. They currently play in the Série B, the second tier of Brazilian football, as well as in the Campeonato Paulista Série A1, the top flight of the São Paulo state football league.

Founded on May 24, 1947, Ituano won the São Paulo State League twice.

The club's home colours are red and black and the team mascot is a rooster.

History
The club was founded on May 24, 1947, by employees of Estrada de Ferro Sorocabana (Sorocabana Railroad), based in Itu. When founded the club was originally known as Associação Atlética Sorocabana. In the 1960s, the club changed its name to Ferroviário Atlético Ituano and in the 1990s the club again changed its name, this time to Ituano Futebol Clube. 

In 1977 a group of sportsmen of Itu unified the football of the city around Ferroviário Atlético Ituano (FAI) and reactivated the Liga Ituana de Futebol (Ituano Football League). In 1978 the club played in Série A3 the third level of the São Paulo state professional football championship. They were promoted to the Campeonato Paulista, the top-flight professional football league in São Paulo in 1989 after clinching the Série A2 championship.

In 2002, Ituano became one of the few teams from outside the São Paulo metroplex area to win the Campeonato Paulista.

Juninho Paulista, a former player from the club's academy and former Brazilian international, became the club's president in 2010. Juninho joined in a player-president capacity helping the team avoid relegation on the final day of the 2010 season with the decisive goal in a 3–2 victory.

In 2014, Ituano won the Campeonato Paulista, defeating the storied Santos Futebol Clube on penalty kicks.

In 2019, Arsenal signed young winger Gabriel Martinelli from the club and he quickly became a first-team regular.

Stadium

Ituano's stadium is Estádio Novelli Júnior, inaugurated in 1947. The stadium has a capacity of 18,000 people.

Mascot
The club mascot is a cock wearing the team kit. The nickname was received in 1957 when Sorocabana played against Club Atlético Ituano (Third Division champions in 1954–55, who have no connection with the current Ituano FC). On this occasion Sorocabana lost the match but the supporters said that the team had fought like a cock and from there the club received its nickname.

Rivalries
Ituano's biggest rival is Paulista Futebol Clube and they contest the Briga de Galo. Other major rivals are Ponte Preta and São Bento, representing the cities of Campinas and Sorocaba, respectively.

Players

Current squad

Honours

Domestic competitions

 Campeonato Brasileiro Série C
Winners (2): 2003, 2021

 Campeonato Paulista
Winners (2): 2002, 2014

 Campeonato Paulista do Interior
Winners (2): 2017, 2022

 Copa Paulista
Winners (1): 2002

 Campeonato Paulista Série A2
Winners (1): 1989

References

External links
 Official Website 
Current Squad

 
Association football clubs established in 1947
Football clubs in São Paulo (state)
1947 establishments in Brazil